This page lists the results of leadership elections held by the Progressive Conservative Association of Alberta or as it was known before 1958, the Conservatives.

1905 leadership convention

(Held on August 16, 1905)

R.B. Bennett acclaimed

Developments 1905-1923

Bennett was defeated in the 1905 general election and Albert Robertson was chosen House leader. Robertson in turn was defeated in the 1909 general election. Afterwards, Bennett, who had been elected, became House leader. Bennett resigned in 1910 and Edward Michener became House leader on July 5. Michener resigned after the 1917 general election when he was appointed to the Senate. George Hoadley was chosen House leader on February 8, 1918. He was removed on February 17, 1920 in favour of James Ramsey. Ramsey was in turn ousted in 1921 in favour of Albert Ewing and the Conservative caucus was split. After the Conservative Party's disastrous performance in the  1921 general election the only Conservative left in the legislature was the independent John Smith Stewart.

1923 leadership convention

(Held on December 14, 1923)

William John Blair acclaimed

R.B. Bennett, Albert Ewing, and Alexander McGillivray were nominated but declined.

1925 leadership convention

(Held on August 5, 1925)

Alexander McGillivray acclaimed

1930 leadership convention

(Held on January 11, 1930)

David Milwyn Duggan acclaimed

John Irwin and Charles Yardley Weaver were nominated but withdrew.

Developments 1930-1958

The Conservatives joined a united front with the Liberals in 1937 to defeat the Social Credit government and formed the Independent Movement. As such they stood no candidates in the 1940 election, the 1944 election, and the 1948 election. Duggan was re-elected as an independent in 1940 and died on May 4, 1942. The party was revived in the 1952 election and John Percy Page was chosen House leader afterwards.

1958 leadership convention

(Held on August 16, 1958)

First Ballot:
William Cameron Kirby 150
Alan Lazerte 106
Ernest Watkins 69
Ernest A. Toshach 40
Gifford Main 30

Second Ballot:
William Cameron Kirby 163
Alan Lazerte 128
Ernest Watkins 56
Ernest A. Toshach 32
Gifford Main 18

Third Ballot (Main eliminated):
William Cameron Kirby 189
Alan Lazerte 148
Ernest Watkins 46
Ernest A. Toshach 14

Fourth Ballot (Toshach eliminated):
William Cameron Kirby 206
Alan Lazerte 157
Ernest Watkins 32

1962 leadership convention

(Held October 6, 1962)

Milt Harradence elected
Ernest A. Toshach
Ernest Watkins eliminated on first ballot.

(Harradence elected on the second ballot by less than 20 votes. Harradence and Toshach were separated by only one vote on the first ballot. About 300 votes were cast in total. Vote totals were not released).

1965 leadership convention

(Held March 20, 1965)

Peter Lougheed 300
Duncan McKillop 30

Jon Scott withdrew before balloting.

1985 leadership convention

(Held on October 13, 1985)

First Ballot:
Don Getty 913
Julian Koziak 545
Ron Ghitter 428

Second Ballot (Ghitter eliminated):
Don Getty 1061
Julian Koziak 827

1992 leadership election

First Ballot:

(Held on November 28, 1992)

Second Ballot (Betkowski, Klein, Orman moved to next round and Orman withdrew November 29):

(Held on December 5, 1992)

2006 leadership election

First Ballot:

(Held on November 25, 2006)

Second Ballot (Dinning, Morton and Stelmach move to next round):

(Note: used a preferential ballot)

(Held on December 2, 2006)

On the third Ballot Morton was eliminated, and vote distributed.

2011 leadership election

First ballot

The first ballot was on September 17, 2011.

Two days following the first ballot, Morton and Orman decided to endorse Mar. Griffiths followed the next day.

Second ballot

A preferential ballot was cast on October 1, 2011. Because no candidate received more than 50% of the vote on the first count, the third-place finisher was dropped, and the second preference votes cast on Horner's ballots were counted and added to the remaining candidate's totals. Mar led after the first round, and Horner was eliminated. After second preferences were applied, Redford was declared the winner.

2014 leadership election

(Held on September 6, 2014)

2017 leadership election

(Held March 18, 2017 at the Telus Convention Centre in Calgary)
{| class="wikitable"
! Candidate
! Votes
! Percentage
|-
|Jason Kenney
|style="text-align:right"|1,113
|style="text-align:right"|75.4%
|-
| Richard Starke
|style="text-align:right"|323
|style="text-align:right"|21.9%
|-
| Byron Nelson
|style="text-align:right"|40
|style="text-align:right"|2.7%
|-
| Total|style="text-align:right"|1,476|style="text-align:right"|100%'|}Spoiled ballots: 3''

See also
Leadership convention
Progressive Conservative Association of Alberta

References

Further reading

 
 
 
Canadian Annual Review 1905.

 
Conservatism-related lists